The 2015 Bangabandhu Cup or 2015 Bangabandhu Gold Cup is an international association football tournament organised by the Bangladesh Football Federation as a tribute to Father of the Nation Bangabandhu Sheikh Mujibur Rahman. This was the 3rd edition of the Bangabandhu Cup, after a hiatus of 16 years. It was finally given the go ahead to be played in early 2015 with six nations participating.

Malaysia U-23 won the third edition, after beating Bangladesh U-23 in the final. This was also the first time the host reached the final of this tournament.

Format
In the group stage, six teams were divided into two groups of three teams, playing a single round-robin, with the teams finishing first and second in each group qualifying to the semi-finals.

Venues
Nine matches were played at two different venues in Dhaka and Sylhet. The Bangabandhu National Stadium in Dhaka,  and Sylhet District Stadium in Sylhet.
All matches were played at the following two grounds:

Officials
Eleven referees and 2 match commissioner were appointed by the FIFA for this tournament.

Referees

  Ferdour Ahmed
  Jalal Uddin
  Jasim Uddin
  Mijanur Rahman
  Mohammad Nuruzzaman
  Nahid
  Tayeb Shamsuzzaman
  Hsu Min-Yu
  Bonyadifard Mooud Abbasali
  Khamis Al-Marri

Match Commissioner
  Monirul Islam
  Goutam Kar

Broadcaster
 Channel 9
 Fox Sports 2
 Bangladesh Television

Group stage
 All times are local, Bangladesh Standard Time (UTC+06:00)

Group A

Group B

Knockout stage

Bracket

Semi-finals

Final

Goalscorers
2 goals

  Kumaahran Sathasivam
  Pakorn Prempak

1 goal

  Jahid Hasan Ameli
  Nasiruddin Chowdhury
  Hemanta Vincent Biswas
  Yeasin Khan
  Faizat Ghazli
  Nazirul Naim
  Ridzuan Abdunloh
  Syahrul Azwari Ibrahim
  Syazwan Andik
  Iqram Rifqi
  Taufik Suparno
  Adisak Sensomeiad
  Chayawat Srinawong
  Jaturong Pimkoon

Own goal
  Saleh

References

External links
 https://web.archive.org/web/20160329142039/http://www.rsssf.com/tablesb/bangabandhu.html

2015
2015 in Bangladeshi football
2014–15 in Sri Lankan football
2015 in Malaysian football
2015 in Thai football
2015 in Singaporean football
2014–15 in Bahraini football
International association football competitions hosted by Bangladesh